Bottega University is a for-profit, accredited distance learning university headquartered in Salt Lake City, Utah.

Accreditation and institutional recognition
Bottega University is nationally accredited by the Distance Education Accrediting Commission (DEAC), an agency recognized by the U.S. Department of Education.

Bottega University is also an institutional member of the Council for Higher Education Accreditation (CHEA), the American Council on Education (ACE), the Council for Adult & Experiential Learning (CAEL) and the American Association of Collegiate Registrars & Admissions Officers.

History
Bottega University was launched as Andrew Jackson University in 1994 by Robert McKim Norris, Jr., and D. Michael Barrett, both graduates of the Cumberland School of Law and colleagues at a Birmingham, Alabama law firm. The school was designed as a university catering the needs of adult learners that was both accessible and affordable. Andrew Jackson University was founded as a not for profit. The first classes took place in 1994 in Birmingham, Alabama.

UniversityNow, Inc. acquired the school in December 2010 and officially changed its name to "New Charter University" in early 2011. UniversityNow's funding to relaunch the university came from investors including Kapor Capital, University Ventures, Novak Biddle Venture Partners, Charles River Ventures, Greylock Partners, SV Angel, Floodgate, and 500 Startups. As part of the transition, the university also relocated its headquarters to San Francisco, California. In June 2012, Bottega University was awarded a grant from The Bill & Melinda Gates Foundation, through its Next Generation Learning Challenges organization, to fund research into innovative delivery models in higher education that have the potential to generate high student outcomes at an affordable cost.

In 2015, the school was acquired by Global Heritage Education. As part of the transition, the university also relocated its headquarters to Salt Lake City, Utah and changed its motto to "A University designed for you".

In 2019, Global Heritage was acquired by Bottega, LLC.

In 2020, Bottega LLC received permission from the DEAC to change the university's name to Bottega University.

Academics
Bottega University offers online associate degree programs in Computer Science, Communication, and Business. The University also offers Bachelor's programs in Communication, Business, and Technology. Master's degree programs are also offered in Business Administration (MBA). Microcredentials in Business and Criminal Justice and a Full Stack Development Certificate program.

Schools and colleges
 College of Business

References

Private universities and colleges in Alabama
Private universities and colleges in Utah
Universities and colleges in Salt Lake County, Utah
Distance education institutions based in the United States
Distance Education Accreditation Commission
Buildings and monuments honoring American presidents in the United States
Education in Salt Lake City
Education in Birmingham, Alabama
Educational institutions established in 1994
For-profit universities and colleges in the United States
1994 establishments in Alabama